Direct Contact is a 2009 American action film written, produced and directed by Danny Lerner, and starring Dolph Lundgren, Michael Paré, Gina May and Bashar Rahal. The film was released on direct-to-DVD in the United States on June 2, 2009.

Plot
Mike Riggins (Dolph Lundgren), an imprisoned ex-US Marine in the Eastern European Republic of Gorna, is offered his freedom and money to rescue an American woman, Ana Gale (Gina May), who has been kidnapped by General Drago (Bashar Rahal), a ruthless warlord. But, shortly after freeing her, Mike discovers that the kidnap story was just a ruse to bring Ana out into the open. Our hero suddenly finds himself and his charge being hunted by ruthless government, para-military, and underworld organizations – all who want him dead and Ana under their control. With no one to turn to, and the enemies closing in, Mike must uncover the truth about Ana and bring her to the safety of the U.S. Embassy.

Cast

 Dolph Lundgren as Mike Riggins
 Michael Paré as Clive Connelly
 Gina May as Ana Gale
 Bashar Rahal as General Drago
 James Chalke as Trent Robbins
 Vladimir Vladimirov as Vlado Karadjov
 Raicho Vasilev as Boris
 Nikolay Stanoev as Gun Dealer
 Mike Straub as Lead Marine Guard
 Les Weldon as Anchorman
 Yoan Petrov as Vlado's Son
 Uti Bachvarov as Zoran Posternoff
 Alexander Kadiev as Chopper Pilot
 Teodor Tsolov as Janitor
 Marianne Stanicheva as Screaming Woman
 Gemma Garrett as Linda
 Slavi Slavov as General Drago's Guard # 1 (uncredited)
 Lyubo Yonchev as Passenger (uncredited)

Production

Filming
It is set in and was filmed in Sofia, Bulgaria in 27 days from February 19 to March 17, 2008.

Trivia
 Stock Footage was used from several films of the studio Nu Image / Millennium films library.
 General Drago is wearing the Serbian Eagle on his cap.
 The Flag of the Fictional Eastern European Republic of Gorna has Romanian tricolors with an Albanian Eagle.
 The vehicles have Bulgarian numbers and the Fictional flag of The Republic of Gorna.

Release

Home media
On June 2, 2009, DVD was released by First Look Entertainment in the United States in Region 1. On 13 June 2011, DVD was released by Lionsgate Home Entertainment in the United Kingdom in Region 2.

References

External links
 
 
 Interview with Dolph about Direct Contact  at Movieweb.com

2009 films
2009 action films
American action films
Films set in Bulgaria
Films shot in Bulgaria
2000s English-language films
Films directed by Danny Lerner
2000s American films